Mtshumayeli Moyo (born 24 July 1983) is a retired Zimbabwean football midfielder.

References 

1983 births
Living people
Zimbabwean footballers
Zimbabwe international footballers
Association football midfielders
Zimbabwean expatriate footballers
Expatriate footballers in Namibia
Zimbabwean expatriate sportspeople in Namibia
Expatriate footballers in the Democratic Republic of the Congo
Zimbabwean expatriate sportspeople in the Democratic Republic of the Congo
Zimbabwe Saints F.C. players
Dynamos F.C. players
Highlanders F.C. players
United Africa Tigers players
FC Saint-Éloi Lupopo players